or Yadamon: Magical Dreamer is a 10-minute anime series created by Group TAC that originally ran between 24 August 1992 to 16 July 1993. The series was broadcast every weekday. In the 21-week first run, 110 episodes aired. A second series, with 60 episodes, aired in 1993 on NHK's Educational Channel. The characters were designed by Suezen. It stars Yadamon, a young and novice witch who flies by turning her hair into butterfly wings, rides a magical vacuum and has a talking manatee for a mentor.

Plot 

After causing havoc in the Witch Forest, the queen, Yadamon's mother, banishes her to human world. She does this not only to teach Yadamon a lesson, but also because she has a secret passion for human magazines and books. While at the human world, the queen keeps a close watch at Yadamon which becomes a problem cause she falls asleep almost anywhere.

The human world has gone extremely hi-tech and many animals have become extinct. Yadamon finds herself in the island named Creature Island, where genetically re-created species are being made. In the island, she meets Jean and his parents Edward and Maria.

Yadamon meets many misadventures in the human world due to her curiosity which causes a lot of trouble to the humans and her guardian fairy, Timon, who has the ability to stop time (however, in doing so he shape shift into a clock and is unable to move till the transformation ends).

As Yadamon learns to adapt to human world and use her powers, a new threat is brewing. Kira, the evil witch who was sealed inside a volcano by the queen and the great witch Beril, has escaped. She is out for revenge and has set her eyes to the humans and Yadamon.

In the final series, it is revealed that the true origin of the mysterious egg which generate an evil copy of Yadamon which wishes to cause the apocalypse.

Cast 

Mika Kanai as Yadamon
Rie Iwatsubo as Taimon
Rin Mizuhara as Jean
Issei Futamata as Edward
Mami Suzuki as Maria
Youko Kawanami as Queen
Yuuko Minaguchi as Kira
Kaneto Shiozawa as Enrico/Fairy King
Masahiro Anzai as Butch
Ryuuji Saikachi as William
Kyouko Minami as Hanna/Miiru
Yasunori Matsumoto as Shinui
Noriko Oka as Beril

Episodes

Video game 
 Yadamon: Wonderland Dream (Super Famicom, 1993)

References

External links 
 
Animated Divots

1992 anime television series debuts
1993 video games
Group TAC
Japan-exclusive video games
NHK original programming
Super Nintendo Entertainment System games
Super Nintendo Entertainment System-only games
Tokuma Shoten games
Video games developed in Japan